The Arlington Green Covered Bridge is a covered bridge located off Vermont Route 313 in Arlington, Vermont.
The Town lattice truss bridge carries Covered Bridge Road across Batten Kill.  It was built in 1852 and was listed on the National Register of Historic Places in 1973. It is one of Vermont's oldest surviving bridges.

Description and history
The Arlington Green Covered Bridge is located at the village of West Arlington, crossing Batten Kill just south of Route 313. It rests on mortared stone abutments, of which the northern one has since been faced in concrete. Guying cables are fastened near each of its corners. The sides are finished in vertical board siding, and the roof is metal. There are five small square openings in each of the sides.

The bridge was built in 1852, and is one of the state's oldest surviving covered bridges.  It is also unusual in that it has not had any 20th-century strengthening elements added, a common feature to many of the state's older bridges.  On August 28, 2011, the Arlington Green Covered Bridge was damaged by flooding caused by Hurricane Irene; it was fixed in the following months and reopened to traffic.

See also
List of Vermont covered bridges
National Register of Historic Places listings in Bennington County, Vermont
List of bridges on the National Register of Historic Places in Vermont

References

External links
Arlington Green Covered Bridge at tug44.org

Buildings and structures in Arlington, Vermont
Bridges completed in 1852
Covered bridges on the National Register of Historic Places in Vermont
Bridges in Bennington County, Vermont
Tourist attractions in Bennington County, Vermont
1852 establishments in Vermont
National Register of Historic Places in Bennington County, Vermont
Road bridges on the National Register of Historic Places in Vermont
Wooden bridges in Vermont
Lattice truss bridges in the United States